24fps may refer to:

24p, a film and video format that operates at 24 frames per second
24FPS International Short Film Festival, a film festival in Abilene, Texas
24fps, a short film directed by Jeremy Podeswa